Hyles perkinsi, or Perkin's sphinx, is a species of moth of the family Sphingidae. It was described by Otto Herman Swezey in 1920. It is endemic to the Hawaiian islands of Oahu and Molokai.

The forewing is greenish gray, irrorated (sprinkled) with white. The hindwing is pink with broad, black borders and the abdomen is banded with white.

Larvae have been recorded on Euphorbia, Kadua, Straussia kaduana and other Straussia species.

Taxonomy
Ian J. Kitching and Jean-Marie Cadiou have elevated it to full species status. It was formerly a subspecies of Hyles wilsoni.

References

External links

Species info

Hyles (moth)
Endemic moths of Hawaii
Moths described in 1920
Biota of Oahu
Biota of Molokai